Armando Marsans Mendiondo (October 3, 1887 – September 3, 1960) was a Cuban professional baseball player who played as an outfielder in Major League Baseball from 1911 to 1918. He played in three different major leagues in his career: with the Cincinnati Reds in the National League (1911–1914), with the St. Louis Terriers in the Federal League (1914–1915), and with the St. Louis Browns and New York Yankees (1916–1918).

Biography 
Marsans and Rafael Almeida debuted together with the Reds on July 4, 1911. They are sometimes named the first major league players born in Cuba, which is untrue since Havana-born Chick Pedroes played in the National League in 1902. (Cuban-born Steve Bellán played from 1871 to 1873 in the National Association of Professional Base Ball Players. Its status as a major league is disputed by baseball historians).

Playing career 
Six years before Cincinnati, Marsans and Almeida played "Negro baseball" in the United States as 1905 members of the integrated All Cubans. Marsans also played Negro league baseball in 1923 for the Cuban Stars (Riley, 514). He is buried at Colon Cemetery, Havana.

Marsans played winter baseball in the Cuban League from 1905 to 1928 and was one of ten players elected to the Cuban Baseball Hall of Fame in its 1939 inaugural class.

Managerial career 
Marsans was also a long-time manager in the Cuban League and won a championship in the winter of 1917 as manager of the Orientals team. In , he served as manager of the minor league Elmira Pioneers. In , he managed the Havana Cubans.

See also
 List of Major League Baseball career stolen bases leaders

Notes

References

Riley, James A. (2002). The Biographical Encyclopedia of the Negro Baseball Leagues. 2nd edition. New York: Carroll & Graf Publ. .

External links

 and Seamheads

Cincinnati Reds players
St. Louis Terriers players
St. Louis Browns players
New York Yankees players
Azul (baseball) players
Cuban Stars (East) players
New Britain Perfectos players
Major League Baseball players from Cuba
Cuban expatriate baseball players in the United States
Major League Baseball outfielders
Mexican League baseball managers
Minor league baseball managers
Orientals players
1887 births
1960 deaths
Sportspeople from Matanzas
Baseball players from Havana